Abdallah Al-Sebaai (born 24 February 1976) is a Syrian weightlifter. He competed in the men's lightweight event at the 1996 Summer Olympics.

References

External links
 

1976 births
Living people
Syrian male weightlifters
Olympic weightlifters of Syria
Weightlifters at the 1996 Summer Olympics
Place of birth missing (living people)
Weightlifters at the 1998 Asian Games
Asian Games competitors for Syria